Feet of Clay is a 1960 British crime film directed by Frank Marshall, written by Mark Grantham, and starring Vincent Ball, Wendy Williams and Hilda Fenemore.

Plot
A newly barred lawyer represents a confessed murderer of a beloved probation officer, but all is not as it seems.

Cast
 Vincent Ball ...  David Kyle
 Wendy Williams ...  Fay Kent
 Hilda Fenemore ...  Mrs. Clarke
 Robert Cawdron ...  Saunders
 Brian Smith ...  Jimmy Fuller
 Angela Douglas ...  Diana White
 Jack Melford ...  Soames
 Sandra Alfred ...  Ginny
 Arnold Bell ...  Magistrate
 Alan Browning ...  Inspector Gill
 David Courtney ...  Det. Sgt. Lewis
 Howard Lang ...  Warder
 Edith Saville ...  Angela Richmond
 Ian Wilson ...  Signwriter

Critical reception
The film historians Steve Chibnall and Brian McFarlane describe Feet of Clay as "oddly compelling", "set in a world of prison, drab night streets and stuffy private hotels". At the ending, "once the final flurry of fisticuffs is over, the young lovers embrace, but the acrid atmosphere of the film still hovers over their union".

References

External links

1960 crime films
British crime films
1960 films
Films shot at New Elstree Studios
1960s English-language films
1960s British films